Fehraltorf is a railway station in the Swiss canton of Zurich and municipality of Fehraltorf. The station is located on the Effretikon to Hinwil railway line.

Service 
The station is an intermediate stop on Zurich S-Bahn service S3, which links  and Wetzikon via  and Effretikon. During rush hour, the S3 continues from Hardbrücke to Bülach. Fehraltorf is also served by S-Bahn service S19 during peak periods. On weekends, there is a nighttime S-Bahn service (SN8) offered by ZVV. Summary of all S-Bahn services:

 Zürich S-Bahn:
 Nighttime S-Bahn (only during weekends):

References

External links 
 

Fehraltorf
Fehraltorf